Ceremonial dance is a major category or classification of dance forms or dance styles, where the purpose is ceremonial or ritualistic. It is related to and overlaps with sacred dance and ecstatic dance.

Definition

History

Description

List of ceremonial dances

 Festival dance
 Dance in ancient cultures
 Dance in ancient Egypt
 Ancient Greece
 Ancient Rome
 Indian classical dance
 Ritual dance, Magic/Mystic/Spiritual dance
 Abbots Bromley Horn Dance
 Some Basque dances
 Căluşari
 Circle dance
 Corroborree
 Dances of Universal Peace
Kagura
 Long Sword dance
 Morris dance
 Rapper dance
 Religious dance
 Ritual dances of China
 Ritual dances of India
 Sema, or Whirling dervish dance
 Sinulog
 Sublî
 War dance
 Weapon dance

External links
 -- over 250 links to Classical Indian Dance resources